Stoneridge Investment Partners v. Scientific-Atlanta, 552 U.S. 148 (2008), was a decision by the United States Supreme Court pertaining to the scope of liability of secondary actors, such as lawyers and accountants, for securities fraud under the Securities Exchange Act of 1934.  In a 5-3 decision authored by Justice Anthony M. Kennedy, the Court held that "aiders and abettors" of fraud cannot be held secondarily liable under the private right of action authorized by §10(b) of the Exchange Act.  Such defendants can only be held liable if their own conduct satisfies each of the elements for §10(b) liability.  Therefore, the plaintiff must prove reliance, in making a decision to acquire or hold a security, upon a material misrepresentation or omission by the defendant.

Stoneridge was recognized by The New York Times as the “most important securities fraud case in years,” and also commented by Wall Street Journal, Forbes, and Business Week.

See also 
 Central Bank of Denver, N.A. v. First Interstate Bank of Denver, N.A. (1994)

References

Further reading 
 
 
 

United States Supreme Court cases
United States securities case law
2008 in United States case law
United States Supreme Court cases of the Roberts Court